Jonathan Murray Thoday (born May 1961) is a British television executive and businessman. He is the joint founder and managing director of Avalon Entertainment.

Founded in 1989, Avalon is an entertainment and talent management company, with offices in the UK and US. The company has discovered many acts who have become household names including Frank Skinner, David Baddiel, Harry Hill, Al Murray, Russell Howard, The Mighty Boosh, Stewart Lee, Lee Mack, Dave Gorman, Rob Delaney, Greg Davies & John Oliver. Thoday also manages high profile presenters, such as Adrian Chiles, Christine Bleakley and Fiona Bruce.

In addition to Avalon Management Group, Thoday is the co-founding managing director of Avalon Promotions, Avalon Public Relations, Avalon Motion Pictures and production company, Avalon Television. He has led the expansion of the group in the USA where Avalon Television now produce the sitcom Workaholics and in the UK where the factual division or Avalon Television has produced shows such as Grumpy Old Men, Three Men in a Boat and Heir Hunters. His Avalon TV US branch was signed with Regency Television in 2005.

As a producer he has been responsible for a number of shows including Harry Hill's TV Burp, Not Going Out and Russell Howard's Good News. He also worked with Frank Skinner and David Baddiel to produce the single "Three Lions".

He has also produced some of the largest gigs in British comedy history including Newman and Baddiel at Wembley, the first ever arena comedy show, both Al Murray and Russell Howard at the O2 Arena and the multi-award winning musical Jerry Springer – The Opera, which won all five best musical awards in London's West End. The company has also produced seven Perrier and Edinburgh Comedy Award winning shows at the Edinburgh Festival as well as US comedian Denis Leary's iconic show No Cure For Cancer.

He is no stranger to controversy and has made the headlines on a number of occasions. He negotiated Frank Skinner's £20 million pound move from the BBC to ITV and also handled Adrian Chiles and subsequently Christine Bleakley's move to ITV. Along with BBC Director General Mark Thompson, Thoday was accused of blasphemy for his role as the producer of Jerry Springer the Opera. The charge was unsuccessful.

Thoday read Natural Sciences at Corpus Christi College, Cambridge, graduating in 1983.  He later studied for an MSc in Biotechnology and Genetic Engineering. He is married to Leanne Newman and has two children.

References

British television executives
Living people
1961 births